= HD 134335 =

Star in the constellation Boötes

Observation data Epoch J2000 Equinox ICRS
- Constellation: Boötes
- Right ascension: 15^{h} 08^{m} 35.56370^{s}
- Declination: +25° 06′ 31.0833″
- Apparent magnitude (V): 5.9781±0.0007

Characteristics
- Evolutionary stage: red giant branch
- Spectral type: K1III
- B−V color index: 1.24

Astrometry
Radial velocity (R_{v})	−18.17±0.23 km/s
Proper motion (μ)	RA: −3.759 mas/yr Dec.: −0.806 mas/yr
Parallax (π)	6.8281±0.0380 mas
Distance	478 ± 3 ly (146.5 ± 0.8 pc)
Absolute magnitude (M_{V})	0.05

Details
Mass	3.7 M_{☉}
Radius	19 R_{☉}
Luminosity	126.6 L_{☉}
Surface gravity (log g)	2.38 cgs
Temperature	4,409 K
Rotational velocity (v sin i)	1.1 km/s
Age	217 Myr

Other designations
- BD+25°2876, HD 134335, HIP 74096, HR 5640, SAO 83685

Database references
SIMBAD	data

HD 134335 is a giant star in the northern constellation of Boötes. As a sixth magnitude star, it is dimly visible to the naked eye under favorable viewing conditions. It is located at a distance of approximately 478 light years based on parallax measurements, and is drifting closer with a heliocentric radial velocity of −18 km/s. It may approach as close as 37.3 ly (11.43 pc) in about 7.6 million years.

The stellar classification of HD 134335 is K1III, matching a K-type giant star that has exhausted the supply of hydrogen at its core and expanded. It is radiating 127 times the luminosity of the Sun from its photosphere at an effective temperature of 4,409 K.
